Granastyochus elegantissimus is a species of longhorn beetles of the subfamily Lamiinae. It was described by Tippmann in 1953, and is known Costa Rica, Colombia, eastern Ecuador, Peru, Bolivia, and French Guiana.

References

Beetles described in 1953
Acanthocinini